Bernardo Lemes (born 8 January 2002) is a Brazilian professional footballer who plays as a defensive midfielder for Coritiba.

References

External links

2002 births
Living people
Brazilian footballers
Association football midfielders
Coritiba Foot Ball Club players
Campeonato Brasileiro Série B players